Convoy JW 51A was an Arctic convoy sent from Great Britain by the Western Allies to aid the Soviet Union during World War II. It sailed in December 1942, reaching the Soviet northern ports at the end of the month.

JW 51A was not detected or attacked by German forces and arrived without loss.

Background
JW 51A was the first of the JW/RA convoy series, replacing the previous PQ/QP series which had been suspended during the summer and autumn of 1942. 
The JW series were organized to sail from Loch Ewe, Scotland, rather than Iceland, as previously, and sailed with a substantial destroyer escort to guard against surface attacks, as had proved effective with PQ 18. 
JW 51A was the first outbound Arctic convoy of the 1942–43 winter season, and began the practice of sailing smaller convoys twice-monthly during the winter months to reduce the problems of controlling large groups of ships in the gloom of the polar night.

Forces
JW 51A consisted of 16 merchant ships, which departed from Loch Ewe on 15 December 1942.
Close escort was provided by the minesweeper Seagull, two corvettes and two armed trawlers.
These were supported by six Home Fleet destroyers led by Faulknor.  
The convoy was also accompanied initially by a local escort group from Britain.

A cruiser cover force comprising Jamaica and Sheffield, and three destroyers, also followed the convoy to guard against attack by surface units.

Distant cover was provided by a Heavy Cover Force comprising the battleship King George V, the cruiser Berwick and three escorting destroyers.

JW 51A was opposed by a force of three U-boats in a patrol line in the Norwegian Sea, and the aircraft of Luftflotte V based in Norway.
A surface force comprising the heavy cruisers Hipper, Lützow and six destroyers was also available, stationed at Altenfjord.

Voyage
JW 51A departed Loch Ewe on 15 December 1942, accompanied by its local escort, of three destroyers, and its close escort.
Three days later, on 18 December, it was joined by the ocean escort, while the local escort departed. At the same time the Cruiser Force and the Distant Cover Force from Scapa Flow also put to sea, taking station in the Norwegian Sea.

The convoy was not sighted by German reconnaissance aircraft, nor by any of the patrolling U-boats, and crossed the Norwegian and Barents Seas without incident.

On 25 December JW 51A arrived safely at Kola Inlet.

Conclusion
JW 51A was a successful start to the JW convoy series and to the 1942–43 winter convoy season, with the safe arrival of 16 merchant ships and the war materiel they carried.

Ships involved

Allied Ships

Merchant ships

 Beauregard
 Briarwood
 Dynastic
 El Almirante
 El Oceano
 Empire Meteor
 Gateway City
 Greylock

 JLM Curry
 Oligarch
 Oremar 52
 Richard Basset
 Richard Bland
 San Cipriano
 West Gotomska
 Wind Rush

Close escort
 Seagull
 Honeysuckle
 Oxlip 
 Lady Madeleine 
 Northern Wave 

Ocean escort
 Faulknor
 Fury
 Boadicea
 Echo
 Eclipse
 Inglefield

Cruiser cover force
 Jamaica
 Sheffield
 Beagle
 Matchless
 Opportune

Distant cover force
 King George V
 Berwick
 Musketeer
 Quadrant

Axis ships

U-boat force

Surface force
 Hipper 
 Lützow

Notes

References
 Clay Blair : Hitler's U-Boat War [Volume 2]: The Hunted 1942–1945 (1998)  (2000 UK paperback ed.)
 Paul Kemp : Convoy! Drama in Arctic Waters (1993) 
 Paul Kemp  : U-Boats Destroyed  ( 1997).  
 Axel Neistle  : German U-Boat Losses during World War II  (1998). 
 Bob Ruegg, Arnold Hague : Convoys to Russia (1992) 
 Bernard Schofield : (1964) The Russian Convoys BT Batsford  ISBN (none)
  JW 51A at Convoyweb

JW 51A